Asasetre a village in the Ellembelle District in the Western Region of Ghana, located near Nkroful.

Geography 
Asasetre is located 7 km Southeast of Nkroful located near Axim in the Nzema East Municipality.

References 

Populated places in the Western Region (Ghana)